115P/Maury, is a periodic Jupiter-family comet, discovered on August 16, 1985, from the Palomar Observatory by Alain Maury. When the comet was first announced on 1985 September 6, the confirmation came quickly from other observers located at the Palomar Observatory. To the initial announcement of the comet, several confirmations were announced in multiple different reports were compiled by S. Singer-Brewster, D. Schneeberger, and M. Gallup that found the 15th-magnitude trail of the comet on a plate exposed with the 0.46-m Schmidt telescope. These came from the staff at Palomar Observatory, who used the 1.5-m reflector and a CCD to detect the comet. The comet was continued to be followed and detected, leading to Scientist giving the comet a 8.6 to 8.8 orbital period.

References

External links 
Image of 115P/Maury taken on September 20, 2011.

Periodic comets
0115
19850816